This is a list of current high definition channels that are available in Canada.

French HD Channels

Canadian French Conventional

Canadian / Foreign French Specialties

AddikTV HD
AMI-télé HD
Canal D HD
Canal Vie HD
Casa HD
Dorcel TV Canada HD
Elle Fictions HD
Évasion HD
Frissons TV
Historia HD
Ici ARTV HD
Ici Explora HD
Ici RDI HD
Investigation HD
LCN HD
La Chaîne Disney HD
Max HD
MOI ET CIE HD
Planète+ Canada HD
Prise 2 HD
RDS HD
RDS2 HD
RDS Info HD
SériesPlus HD
Télémagino HD
Télétoon HD
TVA Sports HD
TVA Sports 2 HD
TV5 HD
Unis HD
Vrak HD
Yoopa HD
Zeste HD
Z HD

French PayTV
Cinépop HD
Super Écran HD
Super Écran 2 HD
Super Écran 3 HD
Super Écran 4 HD

French PPV
Canal Indigo HD
Vu! HD

English HD Channels

Canadian English Conventional

USA Conventional

Canadian English Specialties

ABC Spark HD
Adult Swim HD
AMI-tv HD
Animal Planet HD
A.Side TV HD
BBC Earth
BBC First
BNN Bloomberg HD
Cartoon Network HD
CBC News Network HD
CMT HD
Cooking Channel HD
Cottage Life HD
CP24 HD
Crime + Investigation HD
CTV Comedy Channel HD
CTV Drama Channel HD
CTV Life Channel HD
CTV News Channel HD
CTV Sci-Fi Channel HD
DejaView HD
Discovery Channel HD
Discovery Science HD
Discovery Velocity HD
Disney Channel HD
Disney XD HD
DIY Network HD
documentary channel HD
DTour HD
E! 
FEVA TV HD
Food Network HD
FX HD
FXX HD
Game+ HD
GameTV HD
Global News: BC 1 HD
HGTV HD
History HD
History2 HD
Hollywood Suite 70s Movies
Hollywood Suite 80s Movies
Hollywood Suite 90s Movies
Hollywood Suite 00s Movies
Investigation Discovery HD
Knowledge Network HD
Lifetime HD
Love Nature
Much HD
MovieTime HD
MTV HD
National Geographic HD
National Geographic Wild HD
Nickelodeon HD
OLN HD
One HD
OutTV HD
OWN HD
RFD-TV
Rewind HD
The Rural Channel HD
Showcase HD
Silver Screen Classics HD
Slice HD
Smithsonian Channel
Stingray Country
Stingray Juicebox
Stingray Loud
Stingray Naturescape (HD and 4K)
Stingray Now 4K
Stingray Vibe
T+E HD
Teletoon HD
The Cowboy Channel HD
Toon-A-Vision
Treehouse TV HD
TSC HD
VisionTV HD
Vixen TV HD
W Network HD
Water Television Network
WildBrainTV HD
The Weather Network HD
XITE 4K
YTV HD

Canadian English Sports Specialties

beIN Sports HD
Leafs Nation Network HD
NBA TV Canada HD
OneSoccer
REV TV Canada HD
Sportsman Channel HD
Sportsnet 360 HD
Sportsnet East HD
Sportsnet Ontario HD
Sportsnet West HD
Sportsnet Pacific HD
Sportsnet One HD
Sportsnet One Flames HD
Sportsnet One Oilers HD
Sportsnet One Canucks HD
Sportsnet World HD
TSN1 HD
TSN2 HD
TSN3 HD
TSN4 HD
TSN5 HD
Wild TV HD

English Pay TV

Family HD
Family Jr. HD
Crave 1 HD
Crave 2 HD
Crave 3 HD
HBO Canada 1 HD
HBO Canada 2 HD
Skinemax HD
Starz 1 HD
Starz 2 HD
Super Channel 1 HD
Super Channel 2 HD
Super Channel 3 HD
Super Channel 4 HD

English Pay-Per-View 
Vu!
Shaw PPV

Foreign English Specialties

A&E HD
AMC HD
American Heroes Channel HD
AXS TV 
BBC World News HD
BET HD
Big Ten Network HD
CBS Sports Network HD
CNBC HD
CNN HD
Fox News Channel HD
Fox Sports Racing HD
Game Show Network HD
Golf Channel HD
HLN HD
MLB Network HD
MSNBC HD
NASA TV HD
NFL Network HD
Paramount Network HD
Playboy TV HD
TLC HD
Turner Classic Movies HD
WWE Network HD

Multicultural HD Channels
 All TV HD
 APTN HD
 ATN Sony TV HD
 ATN Channel HD
 Chakde TV HD
 Fairchild TV 2 HD
 Prime Asia TV
 TET
 TLN HD
 Univision Canada HD
 Vanakkam HD
 WIN Caribbean HD
 WOWtv HD
 Zee TV Canada HD

Special HD Channels
Fireplace/Aquarium HD
The Frame HD
3D Preview

Live Sports
NFL Sunday Ticket HD
NFL RedZone HD
NHL Centre Ice HD
MLB Extra Innings HD
NBA League Pass HD
NCAA Season Ticket HD

See also
List of Canadian specialty channels
List of United States stations available in Canada
List of Canadian stations available in the United States

High-definition television
Cable television in Canada